Eisenhower Middle/High School is a Grades 6–12 school near Russell, Pennsylvania that serves around 550 pupils. Eisenhower was constructed in 1956 and the last renovation was completed in 2014 / 2015. It is one of four high schools in the Warren County School District.

Extracurriculars
The district offers a variety of clubs, activities and sports.

Athletics
Eisenhower participated in PIAA District 10:

Students at Eisenhower can also participate at cooperative sports at Warren Area High School for Swimming.

Clubs and activities
The following extracurriculars are available at Eisenhower Middle/High School.

 Academic Bowl
 Audio Visual
 Club Crossroads (Christian Fellowship)
 Concert Band (Senior High or Middle School)
 Jazz Band
 Key Club
 Middle Level Choir
 National Honor Society
 Prom Committee
 SADD
 Senior Choir
 Spanish
 Student Council
 Trap Team
 Yearbook

Vocational education opportunities
Sophomores, Juniors and Seniors at Eisenhower have the opportunity to spend one-half of each school day at the Warren County Career Center in Warren where they can learn from one of fourteen career programs, as well as the possibility of earning advanced placement credits for post-secondary education.

References

Public high schools in Pennsylvania
Schools in Warren County, Pennsylvania
Educational institutions established in 1956
Public middle schools in Pennsylvania
1956 establishments in Pennsylvania